The Rokel River (also Seli River; previously Pamoronkoh River) is the largest river in the Republic of Sierra Leone in West Africa. The river basin measures  in size, with the drainage divided by the Gbengbe and Kabala hills and the Sula Mountains. The estuary which extends over an area of  became a Ramsar wetland site of importance in 1999.

Geography
Freetown and Pepel are the two ports located on the shores of the estuary. The southern shore is the deepest and forms a natural harbour, which is reported to be the third largest in the world.

Mangrove swamps and the mud flats are the dominant ecosystem (accounting for 19% of the mangrove forest in the country) noted around the river's ria. The river basin measures  in size, with the drainage divided by the Gbengbe and Kabala hills and the Sula Mountains. The Rokel drops  at the Bumbuna waterfalls.

Geology
Rokel River and its tributaries are defined as the "Rokel River Group" for geological study. The geological formation in this group is reported to be of the Tabe formation with glacial sediments dominating its eastern edge and are exposed along the river in some stretches; the geological formation noted in the river is granite rocks. The formation is broadly categorized as folded sedimentary rocks. It is also reported that its orogeny belongs to the Pan African thermo-tectonic age of about 550 Ma. Geologically it is a tectonically controlled basin with formations of Precambrian, Infra-Cambrian and Pleistocene age. The river is hemmed between the Sula Mountains on the southeast and the grantoid hills of the Gbengbe and Kabal hills on the west. The notable cascade in the river is known as the Bumbuna water falls where the river drops by  providing for building a hydroelectric project.

History
John MacCormac, an Irish businessman, settled on Timbo Island in 1816 and started exporting African Oak from the Rokel River. The trade was quite substantial for a while but eventually went into decline.
Iron ore and alluvial gold mining began in the late 1920s and early 1930s, while the Bumbuna Falls hydroelectric project is underway.
The Yalunka people established their capital, Falaba, near the source of the Rokel. The site is bounded by Cape Point on the western side of the Freetown, by the Bunce River on one of its banks, and the Tagrin Point where areas of the Rokel joins at the southern end of its mouth.

Development
The Rokel river flow has been measured at three gauge stations. There are many projects developed in the river basin which derive their water supply requirements from this river.

The iron ore mining at Marampa is dependent on pumped water supply from the river. A Rokel River Water Rights Agreement (Ratification) Act was signed with the developers of the mines; the mines are in operation since 1933 to 1975 by Sierra Leone Development Company (DELCO) and Astro Minerals from 1983. The water agreement provides “exclusive and preferential rights to the use of the Rokel waters by special agreement” for a period of 89 years from 1 January 1938. The environmental impacts on the downstream users and disposal of tailings from the mining operations have not been addressed.

Gold mining in the Sula Mountains and in the Rokel river sediments was an extensive operation undertaken since 1929 in the river and its tributaries after gold was found in the mountains. Steam sediment studies were carried out for assessing the mineral concentration of arsenic. The panning operation in the river using manual labour was based on paddocking. This alluvial gold mining operation has been described as environmentally destructive as forest denudation for the purpose of mining caused extensive erosion of the hills and consequent sedimentation of the river and its tributaries.

The Magbass Irrigation Project was implemented downstream of the dam. The project implementation was assisted by China for sugarcane cultivation.

Flora and fauna
The flora in the estuary consists of mangrove forest. The avifauna in the area consists of 10,000 birds of 36 species (1995 record). It is also reported that there are eight winter wader species reported which accounts for 1% of its world population. The eight species of palaearctic migrant waders recorded are:

 Ringed plover (Charadrius hiaticula)
 Kentish plover (Pluvialis squatarola)
 Sanderling (Calidris alba)
 Curlew sandpiper (Calidris ferruginea)
 Eurasian whimbrel  (Numeniusphaeopus)
 green shank (Tringa nebularia)
 red shank (Tringa totanus)
 Western reef heron (Egrette gularis)

See also
Mabilafu, main village on the banks of the Rokel River

References

Bibliography

Rivers of Sierra Leone
Ramsar sites in Sierra Leone